Sports Complex station is a railroad station in South Korea.

 Sports Complex station (Seoul)
 Sports Complex station (Busan Metro)